"Ka Mānu" (English: "Afloat") is a Māori language song, released in 2019 to protest the Ihumātao housing development. Written by musician Rob Ruha, it was released as a collaboration between Ruha and a number of New Zealand musicians, Bella Kalolo, Maisey Rika, Majic Pāora, Ria Hall, Seth Haapu, Troy Kingi and The Witch Dr.

Background and composition 

Since 2016, protest group SOUL had been occupying land at Ihumātao in Māngere, South Auckland, after Fletcher Building acquired the historical site in order to develop a housing project. On 3 July 2019, SOUL were served an eviction notice, and five people were arrested. On 4 August 2019, SOUL protestors and supporters held a hikoi to protest this action, and on 5 August a number of protests were held nationally, including at the Fletcher headquarters in Penrose.

Ruha was overseas in Japan during the early August protests, and was inspired to write a support song for movement after noticing how much of a national response the protests received. A reggae song sung in G major, Ruha and his wife Cilla began organising the project in early August, and recorded the song on 11 August 2019 at Parachute Studios in central Auckland. The song was released soon after on 16 August 2019.

Ruha was inspiration behind "Ka Mānu" was the story of Jesus walking on water in Matthew 14. Ruha intended for the song to express unity and peaceful resistance, and highlight the common issues indigenous people face globally.

Reception

At the 2020 Waiata Māori Music Awards, "Ka Mānu" won the award for most successful single sung in Te Reo on New Zealand radio, and the Maioha Award at the 2020 APRA Silver Scroll Awards.

Credits and personnel
Credits adapted from Tidal and YouTube.

Leo Coghini – keyboards
Thabani Gapara – alto saxophone
Seth Haapu – vocals
Ria Hall – vocals
Marika Hodgson – Bass
Horomona Horo – taonga pūoro
James Illingworth – piano, hammond
Bella Kalolo – vocals
Tyna Keelan – guitar
Troy Kingi – vocals
Jake Krishnamurti – Trumpet
Darren Mathiassen – drums
Majic Pāora – vocals
Maisey Rika – vocals
Rob Ruha – vocals, producer, composer
The Witch Dr. – vocals

Charts

References

2019 singles
2019 songs
Maisey Rika songs
Māori-language songs
New Zealand songs
Protest songs
Ria Hall songs
Rob Ruha songs
Troy Kingi songs
APRA Award winners